Liga 2 may refer to three different football leagues.

 Liga 2 (Indonesia), the Indonesian Second League
 Liga II, the Romanian Second League
 Liga 2 (Peru), the Peruvian Second League
  Liga 2  , the Moldovan Third League

See also 

 2. Liga (disambiguation)
 Druga Liga (disambiguation)
 Liga (disambiguation)